Mary Star of the Sea is the only studio album by American alternative rock band Zwan. It was released on January 28, 2003. "Honestly" and "Lyric" were released as singles.

The album is named both for the Blessed Virgin Mary, from whom bandleader Billy Corgan claimed to find comfort and guidance, and for the Catholic Church in Key West, Florida where he spent time during Zwan's early rehearsals. Seven months after the album's release Corgan announced the band's dissolution, which he attributed to conflicts between the band's members.

Critical reception

The album received mostly positive reviews. David Browne of Entertainment Weekly named Mary Star of the Sea the sixth best album of 2003. The Alternative Press called the album a "return to form" for Corgan. The album debuted at number 3 in the US, selling 90,000 copies in its first week, but quickly descended the charts, and fell short of the sales of any Smashing Pumpkins album. It went on to sell 250,000 copies by the time of the band's breakup.

Track listing
All songs were written by Billy Corgan, except where noted.
 "Lyric" – 3:17
 "Settle Down" (Corgan, Paz Lenchantin) – 5:25
 "Declarations of Faith" – 4:17
 "Honestly" – 3:45
 "El Sol" (Corgan, traditional) – 3:38
 "Of a Broken Heart" – 3:54
 "Ride a Black Swan" (Corgan, traditional) – 4:53
 "Heartsong" – 3:08
 "Endless Summer" – 4:22
 "Baby Let's Rock!" – 3:41
 "Yeah!" – 3:06
 "Desire" – 4:14
 "Jesus, I"/"Mary Star of the Sea" (Traditional/Zwan) – 14:04
 "Come with Me" – 4:01

Deluxe edition
A deluxe edition of the album was also released, which included a bonus DVD entitled For Your Love, a 40-minute collage of interviews, studio performances, and miscellaneous footage, some of which comes from the aborted Djali Zwan album/film.  The songs listed on the DVD are "My Life and Times", "Rivers We Can't Cross", "Mary Star of the Sea", "Love Lies in Ruin", "For Your Love", "Down, Down, Down", "A New Poetry", "W.P.", "Jesus, I", "God's Gonna Set This World on Fire", "To Love You", "Consumed", a different rendition of "My Life and Times", "Danger Boy", and "Spilled Milk", but they are not clips of the full songs.

Personnel
Band
Jimmy Chamberlin – drums
Billy Corgan (as Billy Burke) – guitar, vocals, producer, additional mixing
Paz Lenchantin – bass, vocals
David Pajo – guitar
Matt Sweeney – guitar, vocals

Additional musicians
Ana Lenchantin – cello on "Of a Broken Heart"

Production
Bjorn Thorsrud – producer, additional mixing
Alan Moulder – mixer
Ron Lowe – engineer
Manny A. Sanchez – engineer
Mathieu LeJeune – engineer
Greg Norman – engineer
Rob Bochnik – engineer
Azuolas Sinkevicius – assistant engineer
Lionel Darenne – assistant engineer
Mark Twitchell – second assistant engineer
Jarod Kluemper – second assistant engineer
Russ Arbuthnot – second assistant engineer
Tim Harrington – guitar sound re-enforcer
Linda Strawberry – assistant to Mr. Thorsrud
Howie Weinberg – mastering
Roger Lian – digital editing
Geoff McFetridge – design

For Your Love DVD personnel
Lester Cohn – director
Greg Sylvester, Damon Ranger, Lester Cohn, and Brian Churchwell – cameras
Tony "Tadpole" Mysliwiec – audio mastering
David May – DVD producer
Penny Marciano – DVD production director
Raena Winscott – DVD graphics coordinator
Davi Russo – DVD graphics design
Jim Atkins – authoring

Charts

Album

Singles

References

Zwan albums
2003 debut albums
Reprise Records albums
Albums produced by Billy Corgan
2003 video albums
Rockumentaries
Reprise Records video albums